Wingate Hezekiah Lucas (May 1, 1908 – May 26, 1989) was a U.S. Representative from Texas.

Born in Grapevine, Texas, Lucas attended the public schools, the North Texas Teachers College at Denton, the Oklahoma Agricultural and Mechanical College at Stillwater, and the University of Texas at Austin. He studied law. In 1938, he was admitted to the bar and commenced practice in Grapevine, Texas. He served as an enlisted man in the United States Army from 1943 to 1945 with overseas service in the European Theater of Operations. After the war, he resumed the practice of law.

Lucas was elected as a Democrat to the Eightieth and to the three succeeding Congresses (January 3, 1947 – January 3, 1955). He was an unsuccessful candidate for renomination in 1954 to the Eighty-fourth Congress. He resumed the practice of law in Texas. He was government relations executive with General Electric in New York City from 1958 to 1966, and executive director of the Mid-Appalachia College Council from 1966 to 1986.

He was a resident of Bristol, Tennessee, until his death there on May 26, 1989.

Sources

1908 births
1989 deaths
United States Army soldiers
University of North Texas alumni
Democratic Party members of the United States House of Representatives from Texas
20th-century American politicians
People from Grapevine, Texas